The National Railways of Zimbabwe (NRZ), formerly Rhodesia Railways, is a state-owned company in Zimbabwe that operates the country's national railway system.

It is headquartered in the city of Bulawayo. In addition to the headquarters, it has a commercial-administrative center in Harare and a supply center in Gweru.

The Zimbabwean railway system was largely constructed during the 20th century.

History 

NRZ's history begins with the creation of the Bechuanaland Railway Company on May 24, 1893. It was renamed Rhodesia Railways Ltd (RR) on July 1, 1899.

At the same time, on April 13, 1897, the Mashonaland Railway Company (MRC) was founded. On March 1, 1905 the small Ayrshire Gold Mine & Lomangundi Railway Company — which had been founded in 1900 — merged with MRC. A similar event would occur with the Beira & Mashonaland Railway (also founded in 1900), which merged on October 1, 1927 with the MRC. Finally, MRC itself would be absorbed by Rhodesia Railways Ltd on March 31, 1937.

Nationalization and founding of NRZ 
On April 1, 1947 Rhodesia Railways Ltd (RR) becomes state-owned, retaining the name Rhodesia Railways.

The route from Plumtree (Zimbabwe) to Mafikeng (South Africa), crossing Botswana (which was under concession to the RR), was sold to South African Railways in December 1959.

The Zambia Railway Board (now Zambia Railways-ZR) was founded and the route network in Zambia was disbanded on 1 July 1967. On the same date, the Harare-Mutare section of the Beira-Bulawayo railway was handed over to the Mozambique Ports and Railways administration.

Rhodesia Railways was a heavy user of the Garratt locomotive. In June 1976, 100 of its 109 steam locomotives were Garratts. For operational purposes, Rhodesia Railways was divided into two areas: those lines north-east of Gwelo (now Gweru) fell into the Eastern Area, with all other lines in the Southern Area.

On July 1, 1979, the RR became the Zimbabwe Rhodesian Railways, and the following year (May 1), it gained its current name, National Railways of Zimbabwe (NRZ).

In 1983, the electrification of a 305 km section between Harare and Dabuka began. The first electric convoy circulated on October 22, 1983, with the completion of works taking place two years later.

In 1987, the NRZ renounced ownership of Botswana's interior lines (an act left over from the colonial period), giving rise to that country's state-owned railway, the Botswana Railways.

In 1996, the government of Zimbabwe established a privatized concession to New Limpopo Projects Investments Ltd (NLPI) to build a new link between Bulawayo and Beitbridge, thus providing a more direct rail link with South Africa. NLPI founded Beitbridge Bulawayo Railway Ltd to operate the new link. The line opened on July 15, 1999.

In 1997, the deregulation of the transport industry took place, removing the monopoly of the sector held by NRZ, a fact that led the company to enter into deep decline and accumulate increasing losses.

Crisis
The NRZ has suffered from the general decline of the country's economy. Neglect of maintenance, lacking spare parts, and overdue replacement of equipment have led to a situation were only part of the network is in good condition and equipment problems have led to reduced service. Steam locomotives have been reintroduced since 2004 as coal is in relatively good supply, while diesel must be imported and electricity shortages are common. Further, the company is seriously indebted, making it impossible to solve this situation without external help. Goods transport has declined, from 18 million tonnes in 1998 to 2 million tonnes in 2010.

Recapitalisation

Between May and July 2017, a bidding process for the recapitalization/privatization of the company was initiated. Six companies successfully submitted their proposals. The winner of the process was the Diaspora Infrastructure Development Group (DIDG), a consortium of Zimbabwean and South African companies. Subsequently, the bid was canceled due to irregularities.

Operations 

The gauge is standard for all of southern Africa. NRZ has an important transit function in the southern part of Africa and is well linked with neighboring countries: toward the north, at Victoria Falls the system links to the Zambia Railways, crossing the Victoria Falls Bridge. To the east, the system links to the Mozambique Ports and Railways. A second line toward Mozambique reaches Maputo. To the west, a connecting line link ups to Botswana Railways to reach South Africa, eventually reaching Durban and Cape Town. A direct line to South Africa from Bulawayo was opened in 1999 by the Beitbridge Bulawayo Railway. The  Gweru-Harare section is electrified at 25 kV AC. The section was extensively vandalised and the copper cables stolen; the line is no longer functional.

Steam
Steam locomotives are still used in Zimbabwe; they have proven so popular with tourists that there are plans to refurbish several more steam locomotives. However, funding is constrained, and diesel-hauled freight transport is a higher priority.

Major accidents 

 On 3 June 2006 five fatalities occurred in the Ngungumbane rail crash.
 On 1 February 2003 40 people died in the Dete train crash.

Major lines and stations

Museum

The Zimbabwe National Railways Museum is in Bulawayo; it has a selection of locomotives, railway carriages and other interesting things.  One of the exhibits is a Rhodesia Railways class DE2 diesel locomotive.

Well known employees (past and present) 
Former Vice President Joshua Nkomo worked there as a social worker in 1948.
Sir Roy Welensky, the last Prime Minister of the Federation of Rhodesia and Nyasaland, worked as an engineer for Rhodesia Railways before entering politics.
Frank Edward Hough, Esq., O.B.E., was Chief Mechanical Engineer for Rhodesia Railways, from which he was appointed a C.B.E. in 1953.

See also 
 Transport in Zimbabwe
History of Zimbabwe

References

Sources

External links 

Official Website
How to Travel Info
About the Railway Museum
 illustrated account of the development of the railways of Rhodesia
Steam Railway Photographs - Zimbabwe

Railway companies of Zimbabwe
3 ft 6 in gauge railways in Zimbabwe